Den Dolder is a railway station located in Den Dolder, Netherlands. The station is located on the Utrecht–Kampen railway (Utrecht-Amersfoort-Zwolle) and the Den Dolder–Baarn railway. It was opened in 1895. The current island platform was opened in 1914. This station was previously called Dolderscheweg (1895-1912).

Train services

Bus services

References

External links
NS website 
Dutch Public Transport journey planner 

Railway stations in Utrecht (province)
Railway stations opened in 1895
Railway stations opened in 1914
Railway stations on the Centraalspoorweg
Railway stations on the Stichtse lijn
Zeist